The 2014 Liga Sudamericana de Básquetbol (LSB), or 2014 FIBA South American League, was the 19th edition of the Liga Sudamericana de Básquetbol competition, which is the second-tier South American professional basketball competition at the club level. It was organized by ABASU, which operates as a regional sub-zone of FIBA Americas.

Group stage

Group A
Host city: Mogi das Cruzes, Brazil

Games

Group B
Host city: Ambato, Ecuador

Games

Group C
Host city: Montevideo, Uruguay

Group D
Host city: Bauru, Brazil

Semifinals

Group E
Host city: Buenos Aires, Argentina

Group F
Host city: Mogi das Cruzes, Brazil

Final Four
Host city: Bauru, Brazil

Statistical leaders

Individual averages

Points

Rebounds

Assists

Blocks

Steals

Efficiency
{| class="wikitable" style="width:90%;"
|-
! style="width:10%;"|Pos. !! style="width:70%;"|Name !! style="width:10%;"| G !! style="width:10%;"|
|- align=center
| 1
|align=left|TBD (TBD)
| TBD || TBD
|- align=center
| 2
|align=left|TBD (TBD)
| TBD || TBD
|- align=center
| 3
|align=left|TBD (TBD)
| TBD || TBD
|- align=center
| 4
|align=left|TBD (TBD)
| TBD || TBD
|- align=center
| 5
|align=left|TBD (TBD)
| TBD || TBD

References

External links
Official website

Liga Sudamericana
Liga Sudamericana de Básquetbol seasons